The following is a list of presidents of CONMEBOL, the South American association football governing body.

Presidents of CONMEBOL

See also
List of presidents of FIFA
List of presidents of AFC
List of presidents of CAF
List of presidents of CONCACAF
List of presidents of UEFA
List of presidents of OFC

References

 
Presidents of CONMEBOL
CONMEBOL